The 1981 United Virginia Bank Classic, also known as the Richmond WCT, was a men's tennis tournament played on indoor carpet courts at the Richmond Coliseum in Richmond, Virginia, United States. The event was part WCT Tour which was incorporated into the 1981 Volvo Grand Prix circuit. It was the 16th edition of the tournament and was held from February 2 through February 8, 1981. Eighth-seeded Yannick Noah won the singles title and $35,000 first-prize money after his opponent in the final Ivan Lendl retired with a pulled leg muscle.

Finals

Singles
 Yannick Noah defeated  Ivan Lendl 6–1, 3–1, retired
 It was Noah's 1st singles title of the year and the 6th of his career.

Doubles
 Tim Gullikson /  Bernard Mitton defeated  Brian Gottfried /  Raúl Ramírez 3–6, 6–2, 6–3

References

External links
 ITF tournament edition details

Richmond
Richmond WCT
Richmond WCT
Richmond WCT